Wigington is a surname. Notable people with the surname include:

Clarence W. Wigington (1883–1967), African-American architect
Fred Wigington (1897–1980), American baseball player
Geoff Wigington (born 1989), American musician and singer